Arsames is an Iranian death metal band based in Mashhad. It was originally formed in 2002 by Ali Madarshahi. Arsames has had many lineup changes; vocalist and first drummer Ali Madarshahi is the only original member remaining. The band took their name from a king of the Persian empire during the Achaemenid dynasty, Arsames.

The band plays death metal despite this genre being illegal in Iran and, according to them, considered Satanic by the government.

History
Arsames was formed in 2002. They recorded their debut single "Adiposere" in 2005 in their home studio. In 2006, they independently released the EP Cyclopia.

In 2007, Malaysian documentary maker Zan Azlee interviewed the band as part of I'm Muslim Too!, a documentary on youth in the Middle East.

In April  2010, the band played at Metal Asylum in Dubai.
In November, they played the metal festival Sikkim Fest in India.
They released their debut album, Immortal Identity, the same year.

In July 2011, Arsames announced that they would release an EP of covers titled Persian Death Metal Tribute to Warriors of Metal through the summer of 2011.

Arrest, persecution, and escape
In 2017, Madarshahi, Mokari, and Kheradmand were arrested on charges of Satanism and taken to Vakilabad Prison. They were later released on bail and ordered to stop their activities, an order which they did not heed. The Iranian government eventually sentenced the band members to 5 years in prison each. In August 2020, all three escaped from Iran. Two members of another Iranian metal band, Confess, had been similarly persecuted and sentenced to prison time before fleeing the country in 2015. They were later granted asylum in Norway.

Band members

Current members
 Ali Madarshahi - vocals
 Saeed Mokari - bass
 Soroush Kheradmand - drums

Former members
 Levik Yeremian - guitar
 Morteza Shahrami - guitar
 Saeed Shariat - drums
 Ahmad Tokalou - guitar
 Hamed "Fetusgrinder" Azizi - vocals
 Hamid Yousefi Faverani - guitar
 Hamid Alizadeh - guitar
 Ali Sanaei - bass
 Rouzbeh Zourchang - bass

Discography
EPs
 Cyclopia (2006)
 Persian Death Metal Tribute to Warriors of Metal (2011)

Studio albums
 Immortal Identity (2010)

References

External links
 Bandcamp
 Instagram
 YouTube
 Facebook

Melodic death metal musical groups
Iranian death metal musical groups
Oriental metal musical groups